Deliver Us from Evil is a 1973 American made-for-television crime drama film starring George Kennedy, Jan-Michael Vincent and Bradford Dillman. It originally aired as the ABC Movie of the Week on September 11, 1973.  The film's synopsis is probably inspired from the real-life skyjacker "D. B. Cooper" who on November 24, 1971, hijacked an airliner, extorting US$200,000 and then parachuted out of the plane never to be seen again.

Plot
It tells the story of six male hikers in the mountains who kill a parachuting skyjacker and fight between themselves over his stolen $600,000.

Cast
George Kennedy as Walter "Cowboy" Mcadams
Jan-Michael Vincent as Nick Fleming
Jim Davis as Dixie
Jack Weston as Al Zabrocki
Bradford Dillman as Steven Dennis
Charles Aidman as Arnold Fleming
Allen Pinson as Skyjacker

Production
The film was originally called Fair Game. It was shot in Mount Hood in Oregon's Cascade Mountains. "It's a masculine film, shot against the masculine country essential to an action-suspense drama," write Kennedy. "We expect it to be compared with The Treasure of Sierra Madre."

Reception

Critical response
The Los Angeles Times said the film was predictable but praised George Kennedy's performance.

Release
Deliver Us from Evil was released on DVD on September 6, 2006, by Warner Home Video.

See also
 List of American films of 1973

References

External links
 
Deliver Us from Evil at TCMDB

1973 films
1973 television films
1973 crime drama films
American crime drama films
ABC Movie of the Week
Films directed by Boris Sagal
Films with screenplays by Jack B. Sowards
American drama television films
1970s American films